Abu Bakr Ratib (born 12 June 1896, date of death unknown) was an Egyptian fencer. He competed in the team foil event at the 1928 Summer Olympics.

References

External links
 

1896 births
Year of death missing
Egyptian male foil fencers
Olympic fencers of Egypt
Fencers at the 1928 Summer Olympics